Three Blue Ducks is a six-part Australian television cooking show which follows hosts Mark Labrooy, Darren Robertson and Andy Allen, the co-owners of Three Blue Ducks Group, as they travel Australia in search for inspiration to create six new dishes for their restaurant's menu. It premiered at 7:00 pm on 13 February 2021.

Ratings

References

Australian cooking television series
2021 Australian television series debuts
Network 10 original programming
Television shows set in New South Wales
English-language television shows